The Valencian linguistic conflict, also known as Valencian sociolinguist conflict, refers to the conflict between the use of the Spanish and Valencian languages in Valencia, Spain.

During the Battle of Valencia (1978–1982) the term was used to refer to a controversy about the Valencian language and its relationship with the other dialects of the Catalan language. This discussion is considered to be secondary when compared to the Valencian language controversy, the institutional diminishment of the Valencian language and the dominance of the Spanish language.

Origin 

Valencian sociolinguist Rafael Ninyoles i Monllor coined the term linguistic conflict by the end of the 1960s to refer to certain diglossic situations, such as the Valencian one. In his late works, he described the process of the ongoing substitution of Valencian by Castilian by social elites and the resulting loss of prestige of the vernacular language.

See also
 Resolution concerning principles and criteria for protecting the name and identity of Valencian
 Norms of El Puig

References

Bibliography 
 Climent-Ferrando, Vicent: "El origen y la evolución argumentativa del secesionismo lingüístico valenciano. Un análisis desde la transición hasta la actualidad." – in catalan in english.
 
 

Valencian
Linguistic controversies